Corwith Township is a civil township of Otsego County in the U.S. state of Michigan. The population was 1,748 at the 2010 census.

Communities

History
The first lumbermill in Otsego County was built within Corwith Township at a place called Berryville in 1877.

Geography

Demographics
As of the census of 2000, there were 1,719 people, 665 households, and 466 families residing in the township.  The population density was 16.0 per square mile (6.2/km2).  There were 1,000 housing units at an average density of 9.3 per square mile (3.6/km2).  The racial makeup of the township was 97.21% White, 0.23% African American, 1.05% Native American, 0.17% Asian, 0.06% Pacific Islander, 0.41% from other races, and 0.87% from two or more races. Hispanic or Latino of any race were 0.70% of the population.

There were 665 households, out of which 29.2% had children under the age of 18 living with them, 57.0% were married couples living together, 8.3% had a female householder with no husband present, and 29.8% were non-families. 24.2% of all households were made up of individuals, and 9.6% had someone living alone who was 65 years of age or older.  The average household size was 2.55 and the average family size was 2.96.

In the township the population was spread out, with 24.2% under the age of 18, 9.7% from 18 to 24, 28.1% from 25 to 44, 24.3% from 45 to 64, and 13.7% who were 65 years of age or older.  The median age was 38 years. For every 100 females, there were 99.7 males.  For every 100 females age 18 and over, there were 103.0 males.

The median income for a household in the township was $32,348, and the median income for a family was $38,102. Males had a median income of $25,461 versus $19,511 for females. The per capita income for the township was $15,936.  About 7.4% of families and 11.9% of the population were below the poverty line, including 13.8% of those under age 18 and 7.5% of those age 65 or over.

References

Sources

Townships in Otsego County, Michigan
Townships in Michigan